Liers in Wait were a Gothenburg, Sweden-based death metal band active between 1990 and 1995.

The group was formed by Kristian Wåhlin after the dissolution of Grotesque, a precursor to At the Gates, and for a very brief time featured the band's core members (Tomas Lindberg, Anders Björler and Alf Svensson). By the time songwriting materialized for the EP Spiritually Uncontrolled Art in 1992, the line-up consisted of Wåhlin and Johan Österberg (guitars), Mattias Gustavsson (bass guitar) and Hans Nilsson (drums). Christofer Johnsson from symphonic death metal band Therion would lend his vocals for the studio recording.

The band played two shows in Poland and produced a Slayer cover for a record company compilation, but due to instability of the line-up, the group ultimately dissolved in 1995. 

Daniel Erlandsson would play drums for In Flames, Eucharist, and Armageddon before settling with popular melodic death metal band Arch Enemy; and Wåhlin, Osterburg and Nilsson would go on to form Diabolique. The following year, Nilsson would also join Dimension Zero.

Members

Last known line-up
Kristian Wåhlin - guitar (1990–1995)
Johan Österberg - guitar, vocals (1992–1995)
Mattias Gustavsson - bass guitar (1991–1994)
Hans Nilsson  - drums (1990–1993, 1995)

Former line-up
Christofer Johnsson - vocals (1992)
Tomas Lindberg - vocals (1990)
Anders Björler - guitar (1990)
Alf Svensson - guitar (1990)
Mattias Lindeblad - bass guitar (1990–1991)
Daniel Erlandsson - drums (1994)

Discography
Spiritually Uncontrolled Art (1992, EP)

External links
Black Sun Records Page with biography, discography, and sample
Tartarean Desire biography

Swedish death metal musical groups
Musical groups established in 1990
Musical groups disestablished in 1995